Party conference usually refer to a general meeting of a political party.

Party conference may also refer to:
 Party conferences (and party caucuses) in the United States Congress, the United States equivalent to parliamentary groups.